Kenneth John Read  (born November 6, 1955) is one of the most respected sport leaders in Canada. This World Cup alpine ski racer from Canada was a specialist in the downhill and a two-time Olympian. He won five World Cup races during his ten-year international career, all in downhill.

Read grew up in Vancouver, Kingston, and Calgary, and currently resides in Calgary and Canmore. He is the father of World Cup alpine racers Erik and Jeffrey Read.

Ski racing
Read was a member of the Canadian alpine ski team from 1973 to 1983 and competed in two Olympic Winter Games. A lifelong Calgary resident, Read was part of the "Crazy Canucks", the Canadian downhill team of the late 1970s and early 1980s, that consistently challenged the Europeans with a daring racing style. Canadian Corner, a section of the Lauberhorn near Wengen in Switzerland - the heavily twisting curve at the left-hand transition to the Alpweg is named after the Crazy Canucks, as both Dave Irwin and Ken Read fell here in 1976.

Read's first World Cup top ten finish came in January 1975 in a combined event at Kitzbühel. Later that calendar year, he became the first Canadian (and North American) to win a men's World Cup downhill race, in Val-d'Isère, France on December 7, 1975, where he was one of four Canadians to finish in the top ten. Read went on to win four more World Cup downhill races and his point total for the 1980 season placed him second in the downhill final standings. He was the first non-European to win both the Austrian downhill Hahnenkamm at Kitzbühel, and the Swiss race Lauberhorn at Wengen. These two victories complemented his 1978 win at Les Houches near Chamonix, France, in the Arlberg-Kandahar, ski racing's oldest classic event. Another victory in January 1979 at Morzine was disallowed because of a non-conforming suit due to a manufacturing flaw. His outstanding season in 1980 was marred by an unfortunate binding release, just fifteen seconds into the Olympic downhill where he was considered the gold-medal favourite.

Honours
Read was named Canada's Athlete of the Year in 1978 (Lou Marsh Award) and Canadian Male Amateur Athlete of the Year in 1980. In 1991 he was made a Member of the Order of Canada Canada's highest civilian honour. He was inducted into Canada's Sports Hall of Fame in 1985, into Canada's Skiing Hall of Fame (Honour Roll of Canadian Skiing) in 1986 and to the International Ski Racing Hall of Fame in 2010. Along with his four teammates, the Crazy Canucks were inducted into Canada's Walk of Fame in 2006.

After racing
In his post-competitive years, Read has had enormous impact on sport in Canada and worldwide. A testament to this continued work to advance Canadian sport was recognized by The Globe and Mail naming Read to their "Power List" for three successive years in 2005, 2006 and 2007.

Following his retirement from competition in 1983, Read became a broadcaster with CBC TV Sports and columnist. He also launched the "Breath of Life" Ski Challenge which over the next 23 years raised over $3.8 million for cystic fibrosis research. Two movies have been produced covering the careers of the Crazy Canucks: the documentary "The Dream Never Dies" (1980) and a TV movie called "Crazy Canucks" (2004), which is based on a novel he and Matthew Fisher wrote called "White Circus" (1987).

From June 2002 to July 2008 he served as President & CEO of Alpine Canada Alpin, the National Sport Organization for alpine and para-alpine skiing in Canada. Under his direction, the organization was transformed with athletic results (record performances in 2007 and 2008), strong financial performance and innovative strategies. Canada attained the highest ranking on the FIS World Cup from 14th (2002) to 6th (2008), fully integrated the alpine skiing disabled program (Canadian Para-Alpine Ski Team), which was ranked #1 in the world, secured the finances of the organization including a substantial reserve fund for future athlete development, created a long-range athlete development plan (Aim-2-Win) and published a long-range strategic plan. Over this six-year period, under his leadership Alpine Canada established three National Training Centres, worked closely with Winsport Canada to establish a new glacier training venue (Camp Green at Farnham Glacier), established a snow testing lab, was a key leader within the group of sport leaders than established "Own the Podium" which enabled Canadian winter sport to take top spot (by gold medal ranking) at the 2010 Olympic Winter Games (Note: Own the Podium was the phrase used by Alpine Canada in the development of their Strategic Plan in 2003 and was loaned to the founding group) and established numerous athlete development programs to create a high-performance stream for athletes at all levels.

After resigning from Alpine Canada in July 2008, he moved to the Alberta Alpine Ski Association to work with younger athletes and athlete development programs, between September 2008 and May 2010. In May 2010 Read was named Director, Winter Sport for Own The Podium (OTP), Canada's high performance program supporting athletes and National Sport Organizations in the Olympic and Paralympic Games, resigning in April 2013. In this period, Canadian winter sport moved into the #1 position for two years in both gold medal and total medal count, topping out with 19 gold medals and 37 total medals in 2012 as ranked by World Championship results.

Read has been active within Canadian and international sport for over 40 years, initially as the founding Chair of the Canadian Olympic Association Athletes Council and subsequently member of the International Olympic Committee (IOC) Athletes' Commission (1985–1998). He served as Chef de Mission for the 1992 Canadian Team to Barcelona, where the Canadian Team won 18 medals including a record 7 gold medals. In 1988, Read was named to the International Ski Federation's (FIS) Alpine Committee Executive Board, overseeing the discipline of alpine skiing. In 2007 he was nominated to Chair the FIS Youth and Children's Coordination Group and Alpine Youth and Children's committee, to re-organize youth development programs for the International Ski Federation. This included Chairing the annual FIS Youth Seminar, attending FIS Alpine Junior World Ski Championships and codifying rules and organization for children's events world-wide. In June/2022, Read retired from all FIS committee work and was named an "Honorary Member" of both the Alpine Executive Board and the Youth and Children's committee, in recognition for exemplary work on behalf of athletes and the FIS.

Between October 2006 and July 2014, Read was a member of the ownership group of the Mount Norquay ski resort in Banff National Park,. He resides in Calgary with his wife Lynda (née Robbins, a former racer with Canadian Alpine Ski Team) and three sons, all of whom competed in alpine skiing. Two are members of the Canadian Alpine Ski Team, Erik Read and Jeffrey Read. team. He is an alumnus of the Ottawa Ski Club and Lake Louise Ski Club. The Read family are members of the Banff Alpine Racers, located at Banff Mount Norquay, Alberta.

Popular culture
His World Cup season in 1979-80 was profiled in William Johnston's Genie Award-nominated documentary film The Dream Never Dies.

In the 2006 episode of Corner Gas titled "Physical Credit", Oscar meets with Ken Read to try to persuade him to create an Olympic medal category higher than gold. Read responds that the other countries wouldn't agree to it. Oscar says the old Ken Read would have done it, the Crazy Canuck Ken Read. Read responds that he's not crazy anymore, with Oscar acknowledging it and then claiming that he is now useless.

World Cup results

Season standings

Points were only awarded for top ten finishes (see scoring system).

Race podiums
 5 wins (5 DH)
 14 podiums (14 DH), 40 top tens (35 DH, 5 K)

A victory in 1979 on January 6 was disallowed after a protest due to a nonconforming racing suit.

World championship results 

From 1948 through 1980, the Winter Olympics were also the World Championships for alpine skiing.

Olympic results

See also
 Crazy Canucks
 Jeffrey Read

References

External links
 
 Canada's Sports Hall of Fame – Ken Read
 Canadian Ski Hall of Fame – Ken Read

1955 births
Alpine skiers at the 1976 Winter Olympics
Alpine skiers at the 1980 Winter Olympics
Place of birth missing (living people)
Canadian male alpine skiers
Canadian people of British descent
Living people
Lou Marsh Trophy winners
Members of the Order of Canada
Olympic alpine skiers of Canada
Skiers from Calgary
Skiers from Vancouver
Sportspeople from Kingston, Ontario